Flast v. Cohen, 392 U.S. 83 (1968), was a United States Supreme Court case holding that a taxpayer has standing to sue the government to prevent an unconstitutional use of taxpayer funds.

The Supreme Court decided in Frothingham v. Mellon (1923), that a taxpayer did not have standing to sue the federal government to prevent expenditures if his only injury is an anticipated increase in taxes. Frothingham v. Mellon did not recognize a constitutional barrier against federal taxpayer lawsuits. Rather, it denied standing because the petitioner did not allege "a breach by Congress of the specific constitutional limitations imposed upon an exercise of the taxing and spending power." Because the purpose of standing is to avoid burdening the court with situations in which there is no real controversy, standing is used to ensure that the parties in the suit are properly adversarial, "not whether the issue itself is justiciable."  

In 1968, Florance Flast joined several others in filing a lawsuit against Wilbur Cohen, the Secretary of Health, Education, and Welfare, contending that spending funds on religious schools violated the First Amendment's ban on the establishment of religion. The district court denied standing, and the Supreme Court heard the appeal.

Decision
Writing for the majority, Chief Justice Earl Warren established a "double nexus" test which a taxpayer must satisfy in order to have standing. First, he must "establish a logical link between [taxpayer] status and the type of legislative enactment attacked." Second, "show that the challenged enactment exceeds specific constitutional limitations upon the exercise of the taxing and spending power and not simply that the enactment is generally beyond the powers delegated to Congress by Article I, Section 8." Only when both nexuses have been satisfied may the petitioner have standing to sue.

Flast test
The Court developed a two-part test to determine whether the plaintiffs had standing to sue. First, because a taxpayer alleges injury only by virtue of his liability for taxes, the Court held that "a taxpayer will be a proper party to allege the unconstitutionality only of exercises of congressional power under the taxing and spending clause of Art. I, § 8, of the Constitution." *479  Id., at 102, 88 S.Ct., at 1954. Second, the Court required the taxpayer to "show that the challenged enactment exceeds specific constitutional limitations upon the exercise of the taxing and spending power and not simply that the enactment is generally beyond the powers delegated to Congress by Art. I, § 8." Id., at 102-103, 88 S.Ct., at 1954."

Ruling
The Court ruled that petitioners had satisfied both nexuses and therefore had standing to sue as taxpayers. First, their Constitutional challenge concerned expenditures contained within a law passed pursuant to Congress's Article I, Section 8 power to spend for the general welfare. Second, the law at issue allocated funds to parochial schools and therefore violated the Establishment Clause of the First Amendment. The Court, however, expressed "no view at all on the merits of appellants' claims in this case."

Concurring opinion
Justice William O. Douglas advocated dealing with the seeming contradiction by overturning Frothingham completely.

See also
 List of United States Supreme Court cases, volume 392
 Hein v. Freedom From Religion Foundation
 Valley Forge Christian College v. Americans United for Separation of Church and State

References

Sources

External links
 

1968 in United States case law
United States Constitution Article Three case law
United States standing case law
United States Supreme Court cases
United States Supreme Court cases of the Warren Court